Sofía Daccarett Char (born April 10, 1993), known professionally as Sofia Carson, is an American actress and singer. Her first appearance on television was as a guest star on the Disney Channel series Austin & Ally. In 2015, she received recognition as Evie, the daughter of the Evil Queen, in the Disney musical fantasy film Descendants, and later reprised her role in its sequels. She has since starred in the Netflix romantic drama film Purple Hearts (2022).

Carson made her musical debut in 2015 with the soundtrack album for Descendants, and in the same year released the single "Rotten to the Core". In 2016, she signed to Hollywood Records, and released her debut solo single, "Love Is the Name". In 2022, she released her eponymous debut studio album. That same year, she sang the Oscar nominated song "Applause" written by Diane Warren for the film Tell It Like a Woman,  which led to a performance at the 95th Academy Awards.

Early life
Carson was born Sofia Daccarett Char in Fort Lauderdale, Florida, to José F. Daccarett and Laura Char Carson, who both moved to Florida from Colombia. Sofia chose the artistic name "Carson" after her American maternal grandmother, Lauraine Carson.

She attended St. Hugh School and graduated from Carrollton School of the Sacred Heart in Miami. She attended In Motion Dance Studio, where she was part of the IMPAC Youth Ensemble program, competing across the United States. She subsequently attended UCLA, majoring in communications with a minor in French.

Career

Music 

Carson said she is mainly influenced by pop music and admires artists who "tell stories through their music", cited 20th-century acts like The Beatles and modern acts like Ed Sheeran and Taylor Swift as influences.

In 2013, Carson participated in a BMI Latina musical artist showcase. She performed as part of the cast on the 2015 Descendants soundtrack, which reached number one on the Billboard 200, including her single version of "Rotten to the Core". She was also featured on the Descendants 2 and Descendants 3 soundtracks, which reached numbers 6 and 7, respectively, on the Billboard 200.

In an August 2015 interview Carson stated she was working on her first album. In March 2016, Hollywood Records and Republic Records officially announced that Carson had signed a joint worldwide record deal with both companies. Her debut single was "Love Is the Name", an interpolation of Opus' "Live Is Life", and was released on April 8, 2016. "Love is the Name" had an alternate version featuring J. Balvin, and a music video with Carson and Balvin was released for that version. Carson released a promotional single on August 26, 2016, entitled "I'm Gonna Love You". Carson has performed in NBC's 2015 Thanksgiving Parade, ABC's Disney Parks Christmas Celebration, Univision's Feliz 2016 (New Year's Eve Special), and the 2016 Radio Disney Music Awards, and she was a presenter on ABC's Disneyland 60th Anniversary Special. She performed "The Star-Spangled Banner" at the 2017 A Capitol Fourth, an annual concert at the United States Capitol in celebration of Independence Day.

On January 27, 2017, she released her single "Back to Beautiful" featuring Alan Walker, and on February 15, 2017, she released the official music video on YouTube. "Back to Beautiful" was written by Julia Michaels, who also wrote Carson's next single, "Ins and Outs". In 2018, Carson was featured on three EDM songs: R3hab's "Rumors", Alan Walker's "Different World" and Galantis's "San Francisco". Following the success of "Rumors", Carson collaborated again with R3hab in her next singles "I Luv U" and "Miss U More Than U Know".

On March 26, 2021, Carson released the single "Fool's Gold", produced by Stargate and Jeff Jones. It reached number 38 on the Mainstream Top 40. The song was remixed by Tiësto; his remix, "Fool's Gold (24 Karat Gold Edition)" was released on April 30, 2021. On May 2, 2021, Carson performed "A Whole New World" (from the 1992 film Aladdin) on American Idol with the show's nine finalists. On September 2, 2021, Carson released "Glowin' Up" as a single as a part of the My Little Pony: A New Generation soundtrack, prior to the film's release on September 24. In March 2022, she released her debut studio album, Sofia Carson. Carson and Diane Warren performed their ballad "Applause" from the film Tell It Like a Woman at the 2023 Academy Awards, where it was nominated for Best Original Song. The performance also featured a string section and a full choir.

Television and film

Carson's acting career launched in 2014 when she guest-starred as Chelsea on the Disney Channel series Austin & Ally. A few months later, Carson was cast as recurring character Soleil on MTV's series Faking It. In 2014, she was cast in a starring role in the Disney Channel Original Movie Descendants, in which she plays Evie, the daughter of the Evil Queen from Snow White.

On January 9, 2015, Carson was cast in the co-lead role in the Disney Channel Original Movie Adventures in Babysitting. Filming began in spring 2015, for an early 2016 television premiere. In March 2016, The Hollywood Reporter announced that Carson landed the leading role in the fourth installment of the A Cinderella Story series, A Cinderella Story: If the Shoe Fits, directed by Michelle Johnston and produced by Dylan Sellers, which was released direct-to-video.

Carson reprised her role as Evie in the 2017 sequel Descendants 2, for which she was nominated for an Imagen Award for Best Supporting Actress. Carson played Sloane Silver in the second season of Freeform's Famous in Love in 2018. In January 2018, it was announced that Carson would be starring in the television series Pretty Little Liars: The Perfectionists, in the role of Ava Jalali; it was picked up to series by Freeform in May 2018 and premiered in March 2019. For her performance, she was nominated for a Teen Choice Award for Choice Drama TV Actress. She once again played Evie for Descendants 3, the third installment of the franchise, which premiered on August 2, 2019. In July 2019, it was announced that Carson would play April in the Netflix dance film Feel the Beat, which was released in 2020.

In 2020, Carson joined the cast of the thriller film Songbird, in which played the main role of Sara. Later that year, it was announced that she had been cast in the  romance film Purple Hearts as Cassie. Carson is also an executive producer for the movie and wrote and performed on the film's soundtrack. She voiced Pipp Petals in My Little Pony: A New Generation, which was released on September 24, 2021. In July 2022, Purple Hearts was released by Netflix, reaching the number-one position worldwide. Next, Sofia will star in the Amblin Entertainment film Carry-On alongside Golden Globe winners Taron Egerton and Jason Bateman.

Other ventures
In August 2019, Carson was designated as the first Global Ambassador of the Latin Grammy Cultural Foundation. Her role includes advocating, promoting, and increasing awareness of the foundation's mission and educational programs. Since its establishment five years ago, the Latin Grammy Cultural Foundation has donated more than US$5 million in scholarships, grants, musical instrument donations, and educational events in the United States and Ibero-America.

In January 2020, Carson was named the new global ambassador of beauty brand Revlon. In June 2020, Revlon released Carson's own collection, the Revlon x Sofia Carson collection, which includes lipsticks and nail polishes. In October 2020, she was named a UNICEF Ambassador. On February 28, 2021, she hosted the Hollywood Foreign Press Association Golden Globes Red Carpet Pre-Show. In April 2021, Revlon released a new fragrance for Carson, called One Heart. In 2022, she partnered with the Latin Grammy Cultural Foundation to announce the Sofia Carson Scholarship which will fund a bachelor's degree at Berklee College of Music.

Filmography

Discography

 Sofia Carson (2022)

Awards and nominations

References

External links

 
 
 

1993 births
Living people
21st-century American actresses
21st-century American women singers
American people of Colombian descent
American performers of Latin music
American television actresses
American film actresses
American child actresses
American women pop singers
American dance musicians
Hispanic and Latino American actresses
Hispanic and Latino American musicians
Hollywood Records artists
Republic Records artists
Schools of the Sacred Heart alumni
University of California, Los Angeles alumni
21st-century American singers
Hispanic and Latino American women singers
Sofia